Ballintemple  is the name of several places in Ireland:

Ballintemple, Cork
Ballintemple, County Armagh
Ballintemple, County Cavan
Ballintemple, County Wicklow